Telephone Systems International is a U.S.-based provider of international telecommunications services founded by Afghan-American entrepreneur Ehsan Bayat. TSI operates the Afghan Wireless Communication Company in a joint venture with the Afghan Ministry of Communications.

History 
In 1998, Telephone Systems International (TSI) was formed with the goal of building a commercial telephone network in Afghanistan.

References

Telecommunications companies of the United States